Spaniacris is a genus of spanistic desert grasshoppers in the family Romaleidae. There is at least one described species in Spaniacris, S. deserticola.

References

Further reading

 
 
 
 

Romaleidae
Taxonomy articles created by Polbot